Zilda de Carvalho Espíndola (March 31, 1904 – January 8, 1985), professionally known as Aracy Cortes, was a Brazilian singer, dancer and actress.

In the 1920s and 1930s as one of the stars of musical revue at the Teatro Recreio in Rio de Janeiro, she was prominent in bringing the traditional Brazilian samba forms into theatre (see samba-canção). Cortes is best known for being the first artist to perform Ary Barroso's "Aquarela do Brasil" in 1939.

References

1904 births
1985 deaths
Samba musicians
20th-century Brazilian women singers
20th-century Brazilian singers